The 1917 Columbus Panhandles season was their 12th season in existence. The team played in the Ohio League posted a 3–6 record.

Schedule

Game notes

References
Pro Football Archives: 1917 Columbus Panhandles season

Columbus Panhandles seasons
Columbus Pan
Columbus Pan